Eulecanium is a genus of true bugs belonging to the family Coccidae.

The species of this genus are found in Europe, Australia and Northern America.

Species:
 Eulecanium albodermis Chen, 1962 
 Eulecanium alnicola Chen, 1962 
 Eulecanium excrescens Ferris

References

Coccidae